Ratna Highway (also referred to as H12) is a highway in western Nepal that crosses the districts of Banke and Surkhet in a south to north direction.
The 113.08 km highway starts at Nepalgunj, where it depicts a continuation of National Highway 927 of India and runs towards the North, where it crosses Mahendra Highway at Kohalpur. The highway continues north and leave the Terai Plains, crosses Babai River and terminates in Birendranagar, from where Karnali Highway continues northwards.

References

Highways in Nepal